Lij Mikael Imru (21 November 1929 – 26 October 2008) was an Ethiopian politician who was Prime Minister of Ethiopia from 3 August to 12 September 1974.

Biography
Born in Addis Ababa, Mikael Imru was the only son of Leul Ras Imru Haile Selassie and Woizero Tsige Mariam; he had seven sisters. His father, Leul Ras Imru Haile Selassie was among the more senior princes of the Imperial Dynasty of Ethiopia, and a close confidant of emperor Haile Selassie, a close relative with whom he had grown up. (Lij Mikael's paternal grandmother was the Emperor's first cousin.) Lij Mikael Imru was thus born into the highest levels of Ethiopian society, and was a member of the extended Imperial Dynasty. Both Lij Mikael and his father were known to have very strong socialist leanings, particularly in regard to land tenure and wealth distribution issues.

Lij Mikael studied at Oxford University and subsequently returned to Ethiopia. Lij Mikael served as deputy Secretary of Agriculture between 1958 and 1959. Subsequently, he became a diplomat and was first posted to Washington, D.C. (1959–1961), then to Moscow (1961–1965). For a few months between these diplomatic posts Mikael served as Foreign Minister. From 1965 to 1968 he worked in Geneva for the United Nations Conference on Trade and Development (UNCTAD). After first becoming in 1974 Minister of Trade and Industry, Mikael Imru was appointed Prime Minister by the Emperor, succeeding Endelkachew Makonnen. Upon the deposition of Emperor Haile Selassie,  Mikael Imru resigned from the office of Prime Minister on 12 September. Nevertheless, he served into the following year as Minister of Information.  Although he was of royal blood, his long standing leftist sympathies led the Derg administration to spare him the fate of the rest of the Imperial dynasty, and he was never imprisoned as most of his relatives and former colleagues were.

Lij Mikael became a specialist for rural development and worked at the World Bank. He also actively lobbied the Italian government for the return of art objects looted from Ethiopia during their occupation of that country, and became increasingly active in the areas of human rights in the post-Derg era.

Lij Mikael Imru died after a long illness in Addis Ababa, and was buried at Holy Trinity Cathedral.

References 

1926 births
2008 deaths
People from Addis Ababa
Prime Ministers of Ethiopia
Foreign ministers of Ethiopia
Ambassadors of Ethiopia to the Soviet Union
Ambassadors of Ethiopia to the United States
Ethiopian nobility
Burials at Holy Trinity Cathedral (Addis Ababa)